The Mediterranean Cup was an association football competition contested by men's national teams and national B teams of the states bordering the Mediterranean Sea. There have been three tournaments for the Mediterranean Cup: the first one was officially called Eastern Mediterranean Friendship Cup, the second was called Eastern Mediterranean Cup and the last one was just "Mediterranean Cup".

Italy, Egypt, Greece and Turkey were the four participants of the first two editions (Italy played with the national B team). Spain and France joined in the last edition (both with the national B team). The first edition, the only one with a permanent location, Athens, was played in 1949, lasted less than a month and was won by Italy B. The second edition, from 1950 to 1953, was won again by Italy B. The third and last edition, from 1953 to 1958, was won by Spain B.

Due to political/social reasons (tension between Greece and Turkey, troubles in Egypt) and the introduction of the European Championships in 1960, led to the abolition of further tournaments.

Results

1949

Results

Top Scorers

All-time top goalscorers

Hat-tricks
Since the first official tournament in 1949, 5 hat-tricks have been scored in over 50 matches of the 3 editions of the tournament. The first hat-trick was scored by Georgios Darivas of Greece, playing against Turkey on 29 February 1952; and the last was by Joaquín Peiró, netting a hat-trick for Spain B in a 3-1 win over Italy B on 16 October 1958. The record for the most goals scored in a single Mediterranean Cup game is 4, which has been achieved on two occasion: both by Manuel Badenes when he scored 4 for Spain B in a 7-1 win over Greece and 4 again in a 5-1 win over Egypt. These two 4-goal haul single-handendely make him the all-time top goal scorer of the competition with 8 goals. Badenes is also the only player to have scored two hat-tricks in the Mediterranean Cup. Spain B holds the record for most hat-tricks scored with 3, and Egypt holds the record for most hat-tricks conceded with 2.

List

See also 
Balkan CupBaltic CupCentral European International CupNordic Football Championship

References

External links 
Mediterranean Cup results

International men's association football invitational tournaments
Sport in the Mediterranean